Vasudeva V, or Vasudeva of Kabul was a Kushan ruler circa 300 CE. He was the possible child of Vasudeva IV, ruling in Kabul. His existence is uncertain.

References

Kushan Empire
4th-century monarchs in Asia